The UK Albums Chart is one of many music charts compiled by the Official Charts Company that calculates the best-selling albums of the week in the United Kingdom. Before 2004, the chart was only based on the sales of physical albums. This list shows albums that peaked in the Top 10 of the UK Albums Chart during 2003, as well as albums which peaked in 2002 and 2004 but were in the top 10 in 2003. The entry date is when the album appeared in the top 10 for the first time (week ending, as published by the Official Charts Company, which is six days after the chart is announced).

One-hundred and twenty-two albums were in the top ten this year. Sixteen albums from 2002 remained in the top 10 for several weeks at the beginning of the year, while Elephunk by The Black Eyed Peas and Twentysomething by Jamie Cullum were both released in 2003 but did not reach their peak until 2004. Come Away with Me by Norah Jones, Justified by Justin Timberlake, Let Go by Avril Lavigne and Missundaztood by Pink were the albums from 2002 to reach their peak in 2003. Eleven artists scored multiple entries in the top 10 in 2003. 50 Cent, Busted, Girls Aloud, Michael Bublé and Sean Paul were among the many artists who achieved their first UK charting top 10 album in 2003.

The first number-one album of the year was Let Go by Avril Lavigne. Overall, twenty-five different albums peaked at number-one in 2003, with twenty-five unique artists hitting that position.

Background

Multiple entries
One-hundred and twenty-two albums charted in the top 10 in 2003, with one-hundred and eight albums reaching their peak this year (including Their Greatest Hits: The Record and The Very Best of Cat Stevens, which both charted in previous years but reached a peak on their latest chart run).

Eleven artists scored multiple entries in the top 10 in 2003. Blue, Busted, Elvis Presley, Pink, Rachel Stevens, Red Hot Chili Peppers, R. Kelly, Robbie Williams, Sugababes and Westlife were the acts who had two top 10 albums this year. Busted and R. Kelly's two entries were both released this year.

Chart debuts
Twenty-nine artists achieved their first top 10 album in 2003 as a lead artist. Busted and R. Kelly both had one more entry in their breakthrough year.

The following table (collapsed on desktop site) does not include acts who had previously charted as part of a group and secured their first top 10 solo album, or featured appearances on compilations or other artists recordings. 
 

Notes
As members of Destiny's Child, Kelly Rowland and Beyoncé had two top 10 albums to their name (The Writing's on the Wall in 1999 and Survivor two years later). Both had debut solo albums in 2003 that reached high positions - Beyoncé's Dangerously in Love and Kelly Rowland's Simply Deep topped the chart.

Ex Hear'Say singer Kym Marsh peaked at number 9 with her first and only solo album Standing Tall. Rachel Stevens broke out on her own after S Club went on hiatus and she made the top 10 with Funky Dory, her debut album.

Best-selling albums
Dido had the best-selling album of the year with Life for Rent. The album spent 21 weeks in the top 10 (including ten weeks at number one), sold over 2.168 million copies and was certified 6× platinum by the BPI. Justified by Justin Timberlake came in second place. Christina Aguilera's Stripped, Gotta Get Thru This from Daniel Bedingfield and Come Away with Me by Norah Jones made up the top five. Albums by The Darkness, Coldplay, Michael Jackson, Busted and R.E.M. were also in the top ten best-selling albums of the year.

Top-ten albums
Key

Entries by artist
The following table shows artists who achieved two or more top 10 entries in 2003, including albums that reached their peak in 2002. The figures only include main artists, with featured artists and appearances on compilation albums not counted individually for each artist. The total number of weeks an artist spent in the top ten in 2003 is also shown.

Notes

 "Elephunk" reached its peak of number three on 17 January 2004 (week ending).
 "Twentysomething" reached its peak of number three on 6 March 2004 (week ending).
 The Eminem Show re-entered the top 10 at number 8 on 8 February 2003 (week ending).
 Come Away with Me re-entered the top 10 at number 10 on 22 February 2003 (week ending) for 14 weeks and at number 10 on 20 September 2003 (week ending) for 2 weeks.
By the Way re-entered the top 10 at number 10 on 12 April 2003 (week ending) and at number 10 on 26 April 2003 (week ending).
 Melody AM re-entered the top 10 at number 10 on 8 February 2003 (week ending).
A Rush of Blood to the Head re-entered the top 10 at number 6 on 1 March 2003 (week ending) for 12 weeks and at number 6 on 4 October 2003 (week ending) for 3 weeks.
 Angels with Dirty Faces re-entered the top 10 at number 10 on 11 January 2003 (week ending) for 3 weeks and at number 10 on 15 March 2003 (week ending).
One By One re-entered the top 10 at number 9 on 25 January 2003 (week ending) for 2 weeks.
 Justified re-entered the top 10 at number 8 on 18 January 2003 (week ending) for eleven weeks and at number 7 on 19 April 2003 (week ending) for twelve weeks.
 The Greatest Hits 1970-2002 re-entered the top 10 at number 6 on 13 September 2003 (week ending) for 2 weeks and at number 8 on 22 November 2003 (week ending). 
 Escapology re-entered the top 10 at number 1 on 16 August 2003 (week ending) for 4 weeks.
 Gotta Get Thru This re-entered the top 10 at number 9 on 26 April 2003 (week ending) for 2 weeks, at number 2 on 2 August 2003 (week ending) for 7 weeks, at number 7 on 27 September 2003 (week ending) and at number 7 on 18 October 2003 (week ending).
 Busted re-entered the top 10 at number 7 on 26 April 2003 (week ending) for 8 weeks and at number 9 on 16 August 2003 (week ending) for 5 weeks.
 Stripped re-entered the top 10 at number 10 on 10 May 2003 (week ending) for 6 weeks, at number 6 on 28 June 2003 (week ending) for 2 weeks, at number 9 on 13 September 2003 (week ending) and at number 9 on 10 January 2004 (week ending).
 Their Greatest Hits - The Record originally charted at number 5 upon its initial release in 2001. It re-entered the top 10 at number 9 on 1 February 2003 (week ending) for 3 weeks.
 Get Rich or Die Tryin re-entered the top 10 at number 10 on 29 April 2003 (week ending) and at number 7 on 5 July 2003 (week ending) for 3 weeks.
 Greatest Hits (Tom Jones album) re-entered the top 10 at number 8 on 5 April 2003 (week ending).
 Fallen re-entered the top 10 at number 7 on 10 January 2004 (week ending) for 5 weeks.
Nu-Flow re-entered the top 10 at number 7 on 20 September 2003 (week ending).
 The Definitive re-entered the top 10 at number 8 on 21 June 2003 (week ending) for 2 weeks.
 You Gotta Go There to Come Back re-entered the top 10 at number 7 on 26 July 2003 (week ending) for 5 weeks.
 Dangerously in Love re-entered the top 10 at number 10 on 13 September 2003 (week ending).
 Innocent Eyes re-entered the top 10 at number 9 on 30 August 2003 (week ending) for 3 weeks.
 So Much for the City re-entered the top 10 at number 6 on 20 September 2003 (week ending).
 Permission to Land re-entered the top 10 at number 10 on 27 December 2003 (week ending) for 2 weeks and at number 5 on 28 February 2004 (week ending) for 2 weeks.
 Youth & Young Manhood re-entered the top 10 at number 8 on 30 August 2003 (week ending) for 2 weeks.
 Dutty Rock re-entered the top 10 at number 9 on 18 October 2003 (week ending).
 Pure re-entered the top 10 at number 7 on 22 November 2003 (week ending), at number 10 on 6 December 2003 (week ending) and at number 10 on 20 December 2003 (week ending).
 Elephunk re-entered the top 10 at number 8 on 6 December 2003 (week ending) for 15 weeks and at number 9 on 17 July 2004 (week ending).
 The Very Best of Sheryl Crow re-entered the top 10 at number 10 on 29 November 2003 (week ending).
 The Very Best of Cat Stevens was first released on Polygram in 1990 and peaked at number 4 in the UK. The 2003 version, which features a different cover art and tracklist than the 1990 version, was released on Universal and peaked at number 6.
 Three re-entered the top 10 at number 9 on 27 December 2003 (week ending) for 2 weeks and at number 10 on 17 January 2004 (week ending).
 Twentysomething re-entered the top 10 at number 3 on 6 March 2004 (week ending) for 4 weeks.
 Greatest Hits (Red Hot Chili Peppers album) re-entered the top 10 at number 10 on 31 January 2004 (week ending).
 Friday's Child re-entered the top 10 at number 10 on 13 March 2004 (week ending) for 6 weeks and at number 7 on 24 July 2004 (week ending).
 Figure includes album that peaked in 2002.
 Figure includes album that first charted in 2002 but peaked in 2003.
 Figure includes a top 10 album with the group S Club 7.

See also
2003 in British music
List of number-one albums from the 2000s (UK)

ReferencesGeneralSpecific'

External links
2003 album chart archive at the Official Charts Company (click on relevant week)

United Kingdom top 10 albums
Top 10 albums
2003